The Dandies are a 2 piece Rock band from Potchefstroom, North West South Africa. https://twitter.com/thedandiesza, 6 September. 2016)

Current line up 

Kaihl Thomas Meades -Vocals/Guitar
Tinus Lottering - Drums/Vocals

Previous Albums 

Don't be a can't -  2015

Biography 

The Dandies formed in 2010 with Kaihl Thomas Meades tracking The Jack Rolling Dandy at Pinacle Records with producer Johan Fourie. Leading to the 2015 release of their debut album, "Don't be a Can't" which was tracked and mixed at Antimotion Studios by the renowned engineer and producer David Grevlar.

Lost Children is the 2nd release and first full length album by The Dandies, 20 months and 200 shows after the release of "Don't be a Can't"

Formerly known as The Jack Rolling Dandy's, their debut album playlisted and charted on stations including 5fm, Tuks, Pukfm, VOWfm, MFM, RMR, Grind Radio, and many more. Their debut video, "The Jack Rolling Dandy" has also surpassed 20 000 views on youtube and is a former no.1 on MKtv.

On 1 May 2016 at a Sunday afternoon gig The Dandies bakkie was stolen during a show and over R80 000 in gear was stolen, without missing a beat The Dandies were up and gigging again that Tuesday night at a battle of the bands.

Lost Children features the same powerful Dandies guitar riffs, bass lines and passionate vocals that fans have come to expect as well as a lot of
interesting and diverse beats previously unheard and is definitely something new and refreshing.

The Dandies goal is to make music that can help all the lost children in the world, both young and old.

Lost Children has been out on I-Tunes, Amazon, google play and Spotify since 1 September 2016.

References 

https://www.nme.com/blog/index.php?blog=120&title=10_lesser_known_acts_you_have_to_see_at__2013&more=1&c=1&tb=1&pb=1
http://upper11.com
http://www.mtv.de/videos/23993149-the-dandies-battle-cry.html
http://www.spinner.com/2010/02/15/sxsw-2010-the-dandies
http://www.kingsofar.com/the-dandies/
http://www.swiss-music-export.com/index.php?id=25&tx_ttnews
https://web.archive.org/web/20110715170208/http://music.reeperbahnfestival.com/kuenstler.php?lang=en&art_id=450&page_id=0
http://www.austin360.com/blogs/content/shared-gen/blogs/austin/music/entries/2010/03/10/sxsw_2010_10_questions_for_the.html
https://web.archive.org/web/20110717031450/http://thesovereignsound.com/2010/10/01/interview-with-switzerlands-indie-rockers-the-dandies/
http://www.last.fm/event/1651704+Black+Rebel+Motorcycle+Club+at+Volkshaus+on+14+November+2010
http://starsoakedmusic.blogspot.com/2010/12/dandies-biggest-rock-from-switzerland.html
http://www.worldsend.com/news_detail.asp?newsid=2087
http://www.worldsend.com/clients.asp?ClientID=820378

External links 
https://www.facebook.com/CoastalSonOfficial
https://www.twitter.com/CoastalSon
http://www.myspace.com/thedandies
https://www.youtube.com/thedandiesmusic

Musical groups established in 2006
Swiss rock music groups